Sarria is a village and concejo located in the municipality of Zuia, in Álava province, Basque Country, Spain. As of 2020, it has a population of 269.

Geography 
Sarria is located 20km northwest of Vitoria-Gasteiz.

References

Populated places in Álava